The Women's 10 m platform competition of the 2020 European Aquatics Championships was held on 13 May 2021.

Results
The preliminary round was started on at 12:00. The final was held at 20:55.

Green denotes finalists

References

Women's 10 m platform